Force: Document & Live (stylized in Japan as ) is a video album released by Japanese rock unit Superfly. It is the group's fourth video album, and features content relating to the band's fourth studio album Force and the supporting Live Force tour. The first DVD is a documentary of the recording of the studio album as well as the band's special fan club concert to debut the tracks to the fans. The second DVD contains a recording of the band's stop at the Tokyo International Forum on the Live Force tour. The Blu-ray edition of the album compresses all of the tracks onto a single disc.

Track listing

References

External links

2013 live albums
Superfly (band) albums
Live albums by Japanese artists
2013 video albums
Live video albums